This is a list of peer-reviewed, academic journals in the field of ethics.

Note: there are many important academic magazines that are not true peer-reviewed journals. They are not listed here.

A

 American Journal of Bioethics

B

 Bioethics
 BMC Medical Ethics
 Business and Professional Ethics Journal
 Business Ethics: A European Review
 Business Ethics Quarterly

C
 Canadian Journal of Bioethics
Clinical Ethics

E

 Environmental Ethics
 Environmental Values
Ethical Theory and Moral Practice
 Ethics
Ethics and Information Technology
 Ethics in Progress
 Ethics & International Affairs

H

 Hastings Center Report

I

 International Journal of Applied Philosophy
 International Journal of Feminist Approaches to Bioethics

J
 Journal of Academic Ethics
 Journal of Agricultural and Environmental Ethics
 Journal of Animal Ethics
 Journal of Applied Philosophy
 Journal of Business Ethics
The Journal of Ethics
 Journal of Empirical Research on Human Research Ethics
Journal of Jewish Ethics
 Journal of Law, Medicine & Ethics
 Journal of Medical Ethics
 Journal of Moral Philosophy
 Journal of Political Philosophy
 Journal of Social Philosophy
 Journal of the Society of Christian Ethics
 Journal of Value Inquiry

K

 Kennedy Institute of Ethics Journal

M 

 Moral Philosophy and Politics

N

 The National Catholic Bioethics Quarterly
 Neuroethics

P

 Philosophical Psychology
 Philosophy & Public Affairs
 Philosophy of the Social Sciences
 Politics, Philosophy & Economics

R

 Radical Philosophy
 Relations. Beyond Anthropocentrism

S

 Science and Engineering Ethics

T

 Teaching Ethics

See also
 List of philosophy journals

Ethics journals
Journals